Juan Alvarado Ibarra (January 7, 1915 - February 3, 2003) was a Mexican luchador, or professional wrestler, better known under the ring name Shadito Cruz. Best known as the patriarch of the Alvarado wrestling family that includes six of Alvarado's sons and many of his grandchildren, Cruz achieved little success as a wrestler but became a well respected trainer. He trained members of his own family as well as a large number of non-family members

Professional wrestling career
Early in his career Juan Alvarado was given the nickname "Shadito" due to his physical resemblance to luchador Black Shadow, which stuck with him as a ring name. His wrestling career as Shadito Cruz was not very notable, partially because Cruz was physically very small. At the time of his peak years Lucha Libre focused more on the Welterweight and Middleweight divisions. In 1975 he decided to try a different ring character as he took the name of a Frank Sinatra movie The Man with the Golden Arm and became "El Hombre del Brazo de Oro" for a few months. When his son Jesús Alvarado Nieves made his debut in 1975n Shadito Cruz gave the ring character to his son and instead of wrestling decided on training young wrestlers instead, including most of his six sons for their professional wrestling careers as well as become a referee. Over the years six of Alvarado's sons became professional wrestlers, all using the word "Brazo" in their ring names.

Death
Alvarado died on February 3, 2003, as a consequence of his Alzheimer's disease.

The Alvarado family

The Alvarado wrestling family spans three generations starting with Shadito Cruz followed by his six sons and a third-generation of wrestlers that started working in the late 1990s. Daniel Alvarado Nieves, the youngest Alvarado sibling, wrestled as "Shadito Cruz, Jr." early in his career before using the ring name "Brazo de Platino" (Platinum Arm). On February 17, 2013, the Alvarado family held a special Homenaje a Shadito Cruz ("Homage to Shadito Cruz") show, featuring the La Copa Shadito Cruz tag team tournament. The show honored both Cruz and his wife Ana Nieves and the family traditions they had inspired.

† = deceased

Wrestlers trained
Angel O Demonio
Averno
Axxel
Babe Face
Bracito de Oro
Brazo de Oro
Brazo de Plata
Brazo de Platino
El Brazo
La Comandante
La Máscara
Máscara Sagrada
Máximo
Rey Persa
Shu El Guerrero
Súper Brazo
TNT

References

2003 deaths
Masked wrestlers
Mexican male professional wrestlers
Deaths from dementia in Mexico
Deaths from Alzheimer's disease
Professional wrestling referees
Professional wrestling trainers
1915 births
Alvarado wrestling family
Professional wrestlers from Mexico City